Christopher Poole (born ), also known online as moot, is an American internet entrepreneur and developer. He founded the anonymous English-language imageboard 4chan in October 2003, when he was a still a teenager; he served as the site's head administrator until January 2015. He also founded the online community Canvas, active from 2011 to 2014. Poole was hired by Google in 2016 to work on the Google+ social network, and left the company in 2021.

Personal life 
Poole was born in 1988 and grew up in New York City. As a teenager, he was a member of the Something Awful forum, and frequented the anonymous Japanese textboard 2channel and its offshoot 2chan.

Until 2008, when his name was revealed in The Wall Street Journal, Poole took great lengths to protect his identity, going under the pseudonym of Robert in real life and as moot online. Several journalists noted that the name "Christopher Poole" could be a pseudonym itself, including Lev Grossman of Time and Monica Hesse of The Washington Post.

Poole believes in anonymity on the Internet, and spoke at the TED2010 conference in Long Beach, California, about the value of the concept. In a MIT Technology Review piece entitled "Radical Opacity", Poole was described as being the antithesis of Mark Zuckerberg; while Zuckerberg is outspoken towards his advocacy for a transparent Internet, Poole advocates for a more opaque Internet.

In 2009, The Washington Post reported that Poole had attended Virginia Commonwealth University for a few semesters before dropping out, and that he was living with his mother while trying to figure out how to monetize 4chan.

Career

4chan 
Poole established 4chan on October 1, 2003, using translated source code from 2chan, and sought to combine the anime culture on 2chan with the community on Something Awful.

In April 2009, Poole was voted the most influential person of 2008 with 16,794,368 votes by an open Internet poll conducted by Time, beating out the likes of Barack Obama, Vladimir Putin, and Oprah Winfrey. It was soon discovered that the users of the /b/ board had manipulated the results of the poll in Poole's favor. Several tools were developed to achieve this, including a website that would vote for Poole at a rate of about 100 votes per minute, and a program capable of voting for him at a rate of 300 votes per minute. The other entries in the poll were also manipulated; the first letter of each entry in the poll spelled out an acrostic for "Marblecake, also the game", a reference to the IRC chatroom where Project Chanology was born and The Game, respectively.

In April 2010, Poole gave testimony in the Sarah Palin email hacking trial, United States of America v. David Kernell. As a government witness, he explained the terminology on the site as part of his testimony, including "OP" and "lurker".

Canvas 
In 2010, it was reported that Poole had raised $625,000 to create a new online enterprise, Canvas. Among the site's investors were Marc Andreessen and Joshua Schachter. Canvas officially launched on January 31, 2011, in beta, and featured digitally modified images created by users of the site. In contrast to 4chan, users were required to identify themselves using Facebook Connect. A similar app, called DrawQuest, launched on February 8, 2013.

On January 21, 2014, Poole announced that, effective immediately, Canvas and DrawQuest were shutting down.

Post-4chan 
On January 21, 2015, Poole stepped down as the head administrator of 4chan. Two days later, he held his final 4chan Q&A. Following his departure from 4chan, he began to turn the site over to three anonymous 4chan moderators while looking for a buyer for the website. On September 21, 2015, Hiroyuki Nishimura, the founder of 2channel, took over as the site's owner.

On March 8, 2016, via a post on Tumblr, Poole announced that he had been hired by Google in an undisclosed position, a decision that was met with anger from Google employees, who claimed that Poole's employment at Google was not compatible with its claims of diversity. In June 2016, Poole became a partner at Google's in-house startup incubator, Area 120. He switched positions again in 2018 when he became a product manager for Google Maps. On April 13, 2021, he left Google, after five years at the company.

Legal matters 
In November 2012, it was reported that Poole had sent a cease and desist letter to the startup moot.it, citing the similarities between the startup's name and his username, moot.

References 

1988 births
4chan
American computer programmers
American Internet celebrities
Businesspeople from New York City
Google employees
Living people
Virginia Commonwealth University alumni